Pinus bhutanica, which may be called the Bhutan white pine,  is a tree restricted to Bhutan and adjacent parts of northeast India (Arunachal Pradesh) and southwest China (Yunnan and Tibet). Along with the related Pinus wallichiana it is a constituent of lower altitude blue pine forests. This pine reaches a height of 25 meters. Note that P. wallichiana is sometimes called by the common name 'Bhutan pine'.

The needles are in bundles of five, up to 25 cm long. The cones are 12–20 cm in length, with thin scales; the seeds are 5–6 mm long, with a 20–25 mm wing. It differs from P. wallichiana in the much longer, strongly drooping needles, and the cones being slightly smaller and red-brown, rather than yellow-buff, when mature. It is also adapted to generally warmer, wetter climates at lower altitudes, with an intense summer monsoon. Despite the two being closely related and at least occasionally growing together, no hybrids or intermediates have ever been reported.

References

Further reading
Grierson, A. J. C., D. G. Long, and C. N. Page. "Notes relating to the flora of Bhutan:(III). Pinus bhutanica: a new 5-needle pine from Bhutan and India." Notes from the Royal Botanic Garden, Edinburgh 38.2 (1980): 297-310.

bhutanica
Flora of Arunachal Pradesh
Flora of Tibet
Flora of Yunnan
Trees of Bhutan
Plants described in 1980